Elisavet Teltsidou (born 8 November 1995) is a Greek judoka. In 2021, she competed in the women's 70 kg event at the 2020 Summer Olympics in Tokyo, Japan.

She is the gold medallist of the 2019 Judo Grand Prix Antalya in the -70 kg category.

She won one of the bronze medals in the women's 70 kg event at the 2022 Mediterranean Games held in Oran, Algeria.

Teltsidou won her first gold medal at a Grand Slam at the 2022 Judo Grand Slam Abu Dhabi, defeating Gabriella Willems of Belgium.

References

External links
 

1995 births
Living people
Greek female judoka
Judoka at the 2019 European Games
European Games competitors for Greece
Judoka at the 2020 Summer Olympics
Olympic judoka of Greece
Competitors at the 2022 Mediterranean Games
Mediterranean Games bronze medalists for Greece
Mediterranean Games medalists in judo
21st-century Greek women